Pleun van Leenen (2 January 1901 – 27 January 1982) was a Dutch long-distance runner. He competed in the marathon at the 1928 Summer Olympics.

References

External links
 

1901 births
1982 deaths
Athletes (track and field) at the 1928 Summer Olympics
Dutch male long-distance runners
Dutch male marathon runners
Olympic athletes of the Netherlands
Athletes from Rotterdam
20th-century Dutch people